Austria's Next Topmodel, season 2 was the second season of the Austrian reality documentary based on Tyra Banks' America's Next Top Model. Once again Lena Gercke hosted the show while runway coach Alamande Belfor was replaced by former model and fashion photographer Andreas Ortner. Sabine Landl, who was the styling expert in season 1, also became a permanent member of the jury.

Like last year, the winner was represented by Wiener Models. Among the other prizes were a cover on Austrian magazine Woman, the face of the newest Hervis campaign as well as two runway jobs at the Milan and Paris Fashion Week.

Episodes

Contestants
(ages stated are at start of contest)

Summaries

Call-out order

 The contestant was eliminated
 The contestant quit the competition.
 The contestant won the competition
Episode 4 ended with a cliffhanger and the entire elimination ceremony was shown the following episode.
In episode 3, Lisa quit the competition. 
Episode 6 was a recap episode.

Photo shoot guide
 Episode 1 photo shoot: Jet set ladies (semifinal)
 Episode 2 photo shoot: Beach swimwear; posing with dolphins
 Episode 3 photo shoot: Maids in spooky castle
 Episode 4 photo shoot: Tiger Woods inspired tantrum
 Episode 7 photo shoot: London sightseeing
 Episode 8 photo shoot: Bungee jumping
 Episode 9 photo shoot: Color beauty shots
 Episode 10 photo shoot: Woman covers
 Episode 11 photo shoots: Philipp Plein campaign & modern geishas

Judges
Lena Gercke (Host)
Andrea Weidler
Sabine Landl
Andreas Ortner

References

Austria's Next Topmodel
2000s Austrian television series
2010 Austrian television seasons
German-language television shows
2009 Austrian television seasons
Television shows filmed in Austria
Television shows filmed in Turkey
Television shows filmed in Greece
Television shows shot in London
Television shows filmed in France
Television shows filmed in South Africa